Boryzops is a genus of moths in the family Erebidae.

Species
 Boryzops purissima (Dyar, 1910)
 Boryzops similis (Druce, 1901)
 Boryzops torresi (Dognin, 1889)

References

External links
 
 

 
Melipotini
Moth genera